Colembert is a commune in the Pas-de-Calais department in the Hauts-de-France region of France.

Geography

Population

Places of interest
 The church of St.Nicholas, dating from the eighteenth century.
 The eighteenth-century chateau.
 The manorhouse of La Cabocherie

See also
Communes of the Pas-de-Calais department

References 

Communes of Pas-de-Calais